The 2017 Los Angeles elections were held on March 7, 2017 in Los Angeles, California. Voters elected candidates in a nonpartisan primary, with runoff elections scheduled for May 16, 2017. Eight of the fifteen seats in the City Council were up for election, as well as the offices of Mayor, City Attorney and City Controller. Four ballot measures were also on the ballot.

Municipal elections in California are officially nonpartisan; candidates' party affiliations do not appear on the ballot.

Mayor

City Attorney

City Controller

City Council

District 1

District 3

District 5

District 7

District 9

District 11

District 13

District 15

Ballot measures

Measure M

Measure N

Measure P

Measure S

References

External links
 Office of the City Clerk, City of Los Angeles

Los Angeles
2017
Los Angeles